Villa d'Ogna is a comune (municipality) in the Province of Bergamo in the Italian region of Lombardy, located about  northeast of Milan and about  northeast of Bergamo.

Villa d'Ogna borders the following municipalities: Ardesio, Clusone, Oltressenda Alta, Parre, Piario, Rovetta.

Demographic evolution

References